The  is a law introduced in Japan by the Democratic Party of Japan (DPJ) in April 2010. It grants 13,000 yen per month to parents with children up to the age of fifteen.

Description
The law gives legal guardians of children under 15 years old, born before April 1 of that year, 26,000 yen every month; although in 2010, its first fiscal year, it was 13,000 yen. There are similar child allowance systems in place already but with a means test to check eligibility for benefits.

Revenue shortages
How the measure would be funded was not clearly specified, only that ¥2.288400 trillion would be allocated in the first year, and that it would double after that. The DPJ stated that rescinded exemptions for dependents and marital deductions would help make up the revenue shortfall. The tax revenue increase is ¥800 billion from the exemption for dependents, ¥600 billion from marital deductions, but it is still far less than the expense of Kodomo teate.

The measure has been criticised by local governments. It has been suggested that the bankroll of Kodomo teate should be appropriated by slashing additional appropriation, compiled under Liberal Democratic Party rule, but these additional appropriation contain budgets for emergency economic, employment measures, and new anti-virus measures. 
Heizo Takenaka, former Minister of Public Management, said "It cuts a little waste, but creates a big waste".

At the suggestion of revenue shortages, six out of ten people think it needs income limitation, and chief secretary Ichiro Ozawa turned in remonstrations to the national government for income limitation. Naoto Kan, deputy prime minister, denied there would be any shortages, saying that the cost of undertaking the reform to the country's income should be higher than the expense of the sum total of income limitation.

After all the details of the proposal of income limitation were laid down, the Japan fiscal deficit remains a large percentage of GDP. An OECD spokesman said that the Japanese government should fight the country's falling birthrate by increasing child day-care provisions to enhance the employment rate, which is at a record low. Vice minister Naoto Kan, Minister of Public Management Kazuhiro Haradat, finance minister Yoshihisa Hujii, and Minister of Health, Labour and Welfare, Akira Nagatsuma, all agreed that the remaining burden to local authorities or business enterprises would total ¥508.09 billion 900 million yen, after the deduction of the state budget.

Exemptions and deductions
For revenue, the DPJ said it would abolish the dependent deduction and deduction for spouses. In that case, by the Kodomo teate, a family with a child under the age of 14 would receive an annual remuneration of 5 million yen, and will make income go up by 230,900 yen.

The DJP Manifesto stated that the benefit would help a child until their junior high school graduation, but actual eligibility requirements do not relate to junior high, but rather fixed time periods.

Institutionalized children

The Ministry of Health, Labour and Welfare (Japan) said in cases where children lived in homes for infants or orphan asylums, the parents would not be given the benefits. The number of these cases was estimated as 2400-5000. The head of such an institution said ‘‘they should rethink”. Within the DPJ there is the opinion that such cases do not fit with the idea of ‘‘Kodomo teate’’.

International cases
The Ministry also said that if foreigner parents living with their child in Japan were eligible to receive Kodomo teate, regardless of nationality. In case if the parents are living in Japan while their child is living abroad still the parents will receive Kodomo teate allowance based on certain conditions. In such a case the parents have to declare whether the child is their own or an adopted one. In addition to this, either of the parent must visit the child (who is staying overseas) at least twice a year and must remit money at least every 4 months to be eligible to receive Kodomo Teate.

Application for 554 children
It was reported that a Korean man in his fifties visited Amagasaki city hall and applied for help for 554 children. The bureaucrat refused his proposal, arguing that he was not actually nurturing them. Another city staff member said the man had visited city hall on 22 April, claiming his wife was from Thailand and had adopted 554 children in Thailand.

Notes

References

Child welfare